Koushik Bose (born 15 October 1990) is an Indian footballer who plays as a midfielder for the Mohammedan Sporting Club in the I-League.

Career

HAL
During the time of summer of 2011 Bose signed with HAL SC in the I-League and made his I-League debut in the club's 1-1 draw against Pailan Arrows at the Salt Lake Stadium on 2 November 2011.

Career statistics

Club
Statistics accurate as of 5 November 2011

References

Indian footballers
1990 births
Living people
Footballers from West Bengal
I-League players
Mohammedan SC (Kolkata) players
Association football midfielders